The enzyme cytochrome c oxidase or Complex IV, (was , now reclassified as a translocase EC 7.1.1.9) is a large transmembrane protein complex found in bacteria, archaea, and mitochondria of eukaryotes.

It is the last enzyme in the respiratory electron transport chain of cells located in the membrane. It receives an electron from each of four cytochrome c molecules and transfers them to one oxygen molecule and four protons, producing two molecules of water. In addition to binding the four protons from the inner aqueous phase, it transports another four protons across the membrane, increasing the transmembrane difference of proton electrochemical potential, which the ATP synthase then uses to synthesize ATP.

Structure

The complex 
The complex is a large integral membrane protein composed of several metal prosthetic sites and 14  protein subunits in mammals. In mammals, eleven subunits are nuclear in origin, and three are synthesized in the mitochondria. The complex contains two hemes, a cytochrome a and cytochrome a, and two copper centers, the Cu and Cu centers. In fact, the cytochrome a and Cu form a binuclear center that is the site of oxygen reduction. Cytochrome c, which is reduced by the preceding component of the respiratory chain (cytochrome bc1 complex, Complex III), docks near the Cu binuclear center and passes an electron to it, being oxidized back to cytochrome c containing Fe. The reduced Cu binuclear center now passes an electron on to cytochrome a, which in turn passes an electron on to the cytochrome a>-Cu binuclear center. The two metal ions in this binuclear center are 4.5 Å apart and coordinate a hydroxide ion in the fully oxidized state.

Crystallographic studies of cytochrome c oxidase show an unusual post-translational modification, linking C6 of Tyr(244) and the ε-N of His(240) (bovine enzyme numbering). It plays a vital role in enabling the cytochrome a- Cu binuclear center to accept four electrons in reducing molecular oxygen and four protons to water. The mechanism of reduction was formerly thought to involve a peroxide intermediate, which was believed to lead to superoxide production. However, the currently accepted mechanism involves a rapid four-electron reduction involving immediate oxygen-oxygen bond cleavage, avoiding any intermediate likely to form superoxide.

The conserved subunits

Assembly 

COX assembly in yeast is a complex process that is not entirely understood due to the rapid and irreversible aggregation of hydrophobic subunits that form the holoenzyme complex, as well as aggregation of mutant subunits with exposed hydrophobic patches. COX subunits are encoded in both the nuclear and mitochondrial genomes. The three subunits that form the COX catalytic core are encoded in the mitochondrial genome.

Hemes and cofactors are inserted into subunits I & II. The two heme molecules reside in subunit I, helping with transport to subunit II where two copper molecules aid with the continued transfer of electrons. Subunits I and IV initiate assembly. Different subunits may associate to form sub-complex intermediates that later bind to other subunits to form the COX complex. In post-assembly modifications, COX will form a homodimer. This is required for activity. Dimers are connected by a cardiolipin molecule, which has been found to play a key role in stabilization of the holoenzyme complex. The dissociation of subunits VIIa and III in conjunction with the removal of cardiolipin results in total loss of enzyme activity. Subunits encoded in the nuclear genome are known to play a role in enzyme dimerization and stability. Mutations to these subunits eliminate COX function.

Assembly is known to occur in at least three distinct rate-determining steps. The products of these steps have been found, though specific subunit compositions have not been determined.

Synthesis and assembly of COX subunits I, II, and III are facilitated by translational activators, which interact with the 5’ untranslated regions of mitochondrial mRNA transcripts. Translational activators are encoded in the nucleus. They can operate through either direct or indirect interaction with other components of translation machinery, but exact molecular mechanisms are unclear due to difficulties associated with synthesizing translation machinery in-vitro. Though the interactions between subunits I, II, and III encoded within the mitochondrial genome make a lesser contribution to enzyme stability than interactions between bigenomic subunits, these subunits are more conserved, indicating potential unexplored roles for enzyme activity.

Biochemistry 

The overall reaction is
 4 Fe – cytochrome c + 4 H + O → 4 Fe – cytochrome c + 2 HO                ΔG' = - 218 kJ/mol

Two electrons are passed from two cytochrome c's, through the Cu and cytochrome a sites to the cytochrome a–Cu binuclear center, reducing the metals to the Fe form and Cu. The hydroxide ligand is protonated and lost as water, creating a void between the metals that is filled by O. The oxygen is rapidly reduced, with two electrons coming from the Fe-cytochrome a, which is converted to the ferryl oxo form (Fe=O). The oxygen atom close to Cu picks up one electron from Cu, and a second electron and a proton from the hydroxyl of Tyr(244), which becomes a tyrosyl radical. The second oxygen is converted to a hydroxide ion by picking up two electrons and a proton. A third electron from another cytochrome c is passed through the first two electron carriers to the cytochrome a–Cu binuclear center, and this electron and two protons convert the tyrosyl radical back to Tyr, and the hydroxide bound to Cu to a water molecule. The fourth electron from another cytochrome c flows through Cu and cytochrome a to the cytochrome a–Cu binuclear center, reducing the Fe=O to Fe, with the oxygen atom picking up a proton simultaneously, regenerating this oxygen as a hydroxide ion coordinated in the middle of the cytochrome a–Cu center as it was at the start of this cycle. Overall, four reduced cytochrome c's are oxidized while O and four protons are reduced to two water molecules.

Inhibition

COX exists in three conformational states: fully oxidized (pulsed), partially reduced, and fully reduced. Each inhibitor has a high affinity to a different state. In the pulsed state, both the heme a and the Cu nuclear centers are oxidized; this is the conformation of the enzyme that has the highest activity. A two-electron reduction initiates a conformational change that allows oxygen to bind at the active site to the partially-reduced enzyme. Four electrons bind to COX to fully reduce the enzyme. Its fully reduced state, which consists of a reduced Fe at the cytochrome a heme group and a reduced Cu binuclear center, is considered the inactive or resting state of the enzyme.

Cyanide, azide, and carbon monoxide all bind to cytochrome c oxidase, inhibiting the protein from functioning and leading to the chemical asphyxiation of cells. Higher concentrations of molecular oxygen are needed to compensate for increasing inhibitor concentrations, leading to an overall reduction in metabolic activity in the cell in the presence of an inhibitor. Other ligands, such as nitric oxide and hydrogen sulfide, can also inhibit COX by binding to regulatory sites on the enzyme, reducing the rate of cellular respiration.

Cyanide is a non-competitive inhibitor for COX, binding with high affinity to the partially-reduced state of the enzyme and hindering further reduction of the enzyme. In the pulsed state, cyanide binds slowly, but with high affinity. The ligand is posited to electrostatically stabilize both metals at once by positioning itself between them. A high nitric oxide concentration, such as one added exogenously to the enzyme, reverses cyanide inhibition of COX.

Nitric oxide can reversibly bind to either metal ion in the binuclear center to be oxidized to nitrite. NO and CN will compete with oxygen to bind at the site, reducing the rate of cellular respiration. Endogenous NO, however, which is produced at lower levels, augments CN inhibition. Higher levels of NO, which correlate with the existence of more enzyme in the reduced state, lead to a greater inhibition of cyanide. At these basal concentrations, NO inhibition of Complex IV is known to have beneficial effects, such as increasing oxygen levels in blood vessel tissues. The inability of the enzyme to reduce oxygen to water results in a buildup of oxygen, which can diffuse deeper into surrounding tissues. NO inhibition of Complex IV has a larger effect at lower oxygen concentrations, increasing its utility as a vasodilator in tissues of need.

Hydrogen sulfide will bind COX in a noncompetitive fashion at a regulatory site on the enzyme, similar to carbon monoxide. Sulfide has the highest affinity to either the pulsed or partially reduced states of the enzyme, and is capable of partially reducing the enzyme at the heme a center. It is unclear whether endogenous HS levels are sufficient to inhibit the enzyme. There is no interaction between hydrogen sulfide and the fully reduced conformation of COX.

Methanol in methylated spirits is converted into formic acid, which also inhibits the same oxidase system. High levels of ATP can allosterically inhibit cytochrome c oxidase, binding from within the mitochondrial matrix.

Extramitochondrial and subcellular localizations

Cytochrome c oxidase has 3 subunits which are encoded by mitochondrial DNA (cytochrome c oxidase subunit I, subunit II, and subunit III). Of these 3 subunits encoded by mitochondrial DNA, two have been identified in extramitochondrial locations. In pancreatic acinar tissue, these subunits were found in zymogen granules. Additionally, in the anterior pituitary, relatively high amounts of these subunits were found in growth hormone secretory granules. The extramitochondrial function of these cytochrome c oxidase subunits has not yet been characterized. Besides cytochrome c oxidase subunits, extramitochondrial localization has also been observed for large numbers of other mitochondrial proteins. This raises the possibility about existence of yet unidentified specific mechanisms for protein translocation from mitochondria to other cellular destinations.

Genetic defects and disorders

Defects involving genetic mutations altering cytochrome c oxidase (COX) functionality or structure can result in severe, often fatal metabolic disorders. Such disorders usually manifest in early childhood and affect predominantly tissues with high energy demands (brain, heart, muscle). Among the many classified mitochondrial diseases, those involving dysfunctional COX assembly are thought to be the most severe.

The vast majority of COX disorders are linked to mutations in nuclear-encoded proteins referred to as assembly factors, or assembly proteins. These assembly factors contribute to COX structure and functionality, and are involved in several essential processes, including transcription and translation of mitochondrion-encoded subunits, processing of preproteins and membrane insertion, and cofactor biosynthesis and incorporation.

Currently, mutations have been identified in seven COX assembly factors: SURF1, SCO1, SCO2, COX10, COX15, COX20, COA5 and LRPPRC. Mutations in these proteins can result in altered functionality of sub-complex assembly, copper transport, or translational regulation. Each gene mutation is associated with the etiology of a specific disease, with some having implications in multiple disorders. Disorders involving dysfunctional COX assembly via gene mutations include Leigh syndrome, cardiomyopathy, leukodystrophy, anemia, and sensorineural deafness.

Histochemistry

The increased reliance of neurons on oxidative phosphorylation for energy facilitates the use of COX histochemistry in mapping regional brain metabolism in animals, since it establishes a direct and positive correlation between enzyme activity and neuronal activity. This can be seen in the correlation between COX enzyme amount and activity, which indicates the regulation of COX at the level of gene expression. COX distribution is inconsistent across different regions of the animal brain, but its pattern of its distribution is consistent across animals. This pattern has been observed in the monkey, mouse, and calf brain. One isozyme of COX has been consistently detected in histochemical analysis of the brain. Such brain mapping has been accomplished in spontaneous mutant mice with cerebellar disease such as reeler and a transgenic model of Alzheimer's disease. This technique has also been used to map learning activity in the animal brain.

Additional images

See also 
 Cytochrome c oxidase subunit I
 Cytochrome c oxidase subunit II
 Cytochrome c oxidase subunit III
 Heme a

References

External links 
 The Cytochrome Oxidase home page at Rice University
 Interactive Molecular model of cytochrome c oxidase (Requires MDL Chime)
 
 

Cellular respiration
EC 1.9.3
Hemoproteins
Integral membrane proteins
Copper enzymes